Dichaetaria is a genus of South Asian plants in the grass family.

Slender perennial herbs, the leaves are narrow and flat.

Species
The only known species is Dichaetaria wightii, native to Sri Lanka and Tamil Nadu.

References

Molinieae
Bunchgrasses of Asia
Grasses of India
Flora of Sri Lanka
Flora of Tamil Nadu
Monotypic Poaceae genera
Taxa named by Christian Gottfried Daniel Nees von Esenbeck